Music from Atlas Dei (2007) is an album by the American ambient musician Robert Rich.  New and previously released pieces, all new mixes/edits.

Track listing
”Opening” – 1:01
”Mythos” – 5:47
”Starmaker” – 6:03
”Glint in Her Eyes” – 6:10
”Night Spinning Inward” – 4:41
”Poppy Fields” – 4:33
”Deconstructions” – 6:29
”Symbolics” – 4:37
”Liquid Air” – 4:19
”The Core” – 5:07
”Never Alone” – 6:13
”Minaret (layered)” – 6:04
”Terra Meta” – 5:09

External links
album feature from Robert Rich’s official web site

Robert Rich (musician) albums
2007 albums